The men's 5000 metres race of the 2013–14 ISU Speed Skating World Cup 5, arranged in Eisstadion Inzell, in Inzell, Germany, was held on 7 March 2014.

Jorrit Bergsma of the Netherlands won the race, while Sverre Lunde Pedersen of Norway came second, and Patrick Beckert of Germany came third. Frank Vreugdenhil of the Netherlands won the Division B race.

Results
The race took place on Friday, 7 March, with Division B scheduled in the morning session, at 12:00, and Division A scheduled in the afternoon session, at 15:45.

Division A

Division B

References

Men 5000
5